Andrei Yurievich Zibrov, ; 5 July 1973, Leningrad, USSR) is a Russian actor.

He has acted on stage on Lensovet Theatre.

Selected filmography

Film
Women's Property (1999) as Kostya
Mechanical Suite (2001) as Viktor
Peculiarities of the National Hunt in Winter Season (2000) as Igor Rekhnikov
Peculiarities of National Politics (2003) as Vanya
Rush Hour (2006) as Vitaliy Obukhov

TV
Empire under Attack (2000) as Ageev Vladimir Mikhailovich – Topaz
Streets of Broken Lights (2001–2015) as Knyshev and Igor Gradovikov
Brezhnev (2005) as Konovalchuk
The Fall of the Empire (2005) as Pavel Pereverzev
UE (2006) as Oleg Bannikov
The White Guard (2012) as Alexander Studzinsky
Sherlock Holmes (2013) as Charlie Williams
Trotsky (2017) as Wilhelm II

References

External links
 

1973 births
Living people
Russian male film actors
Russian male television actors
Male actors from Saint Petersburg